Mount Balfour is a mountain located on the Continental Divide, part of the border between British Columbia and Alberta, in the Waputik Range in the Park Ranges of the Canadian Rockies.It is the 71st highest peak in Alberta and the 113th highest in British Columbia; it is also the 52nd most prominent in Alberta.

The mountain was named by James Hector in 1859 after Professor John Hutton Balfour, a Scottish botanist and instructor at the University of Edinburgh where Hector had studied.

Climbing History 
Early attempts to climb the mountain were made from Niles Pass via Sherbrooke Lake. The first ascent was made on August 18, 1898 by C.L. Noyes, C.S. Thompson, G.M. Weed; members of the Appalachian Mountain Club. The party started their ascent from Hector Lake which they had reached by crossing Dolomite Pass to Bow Lake and then continuing south. C.E. Fay had also attempted the mountain in 1898 via the Sherbrooke Lake/Niles Pass approach but were eventually turned back by poor weather and inexperience. Parties from the ACC completed ascents of Balfour in 1909 via Sherbrooke Lake, Niles Pass, Daly Glacier and then summitting via the SE arête.

Geology
Mount Balfour is composed of sedimentary rock laid down during the Precambrian to Jurassic periods. Formed in shallow seas, this sedimentary rock was pushed east and over the top of younger rock during the Laramide orogeny.

Climate
Based on the Köppen climate classification, Mount Balfour is located in a subarctic climate with cold, snowy winters, and mild summers. Temperatures can drop below −20 °C with wind chill factors below −30 °C.

Gallery

See also
 List of peaks on the British Columbia–Alberta border
 List of mountains in the Canadian Rockies

References

Three-thousanders of Alberta
Three-thousanders of British Columbia
Canadian Rockies
Alberta's Rockies
Great Divide of North America
Mountains of Banff National Park
Mountains of Yoho National Park